Griffin House may refer to:

People
Griffin House (musician), American musician

Places
in Canada
Griffin House (Ancaster), a 19th-century house and museum, site along the Underground Railroad

in the United States
(by state then town or city)
Alfred Griffin House, Yuma, Arizona, listed on the National Register of Historic Places (NRHP) in Yuma County
Willard Griffin House and Carriage House, Los Altos, California, listed on the NRHP in Santa Clara County
Smith Griffin House, Hampton, Georgia, listed on the NRHP in Henry County
Griffin House (Portland, Maine), NRHP-listed
Griffin House (Moss Point, Mississippi), NRHP-listed
Griffin-Spragins House, Greenville, Mississippi, NRHP-listed
Smart-Griffin House, Natchez, Mississippi, listed on the NRHP in Adams County
W. W. Griffin Farm, Williamston, North Carolina, listed on the NRHP in Martin County
A.B. Griffin-O.H. Griffin House, Ravenna, Ohio, listed on the NRHP in Portage County
Alexander B. Griffin House, Ravenna, Ohio, listed on the NRHP in Portage County
Griffin House (Chickasha, Oklahoma), listed on the NRHP in Grady County
John N. Griffin House, Astoria, Oregon, NRHP-listed
Griffin-Christopher House, Pickens, South Carolina, NRHP-listed
Mary S. and Gordon Griffin House, McAllen, Texas, listed on the NRHP in Hidalgo County